Archer is a city in Alachua County, Florida, United States. As of the 2010 census, the city had a population of 1,118.

The city is named after James T. Archer, the first Secretary of State of Florida.

History
Archer started in the 1840s as a frontier village named Deer Hammock or Darden's Hammock. The Florida Railroad reached the village in 1858 which shifted the site of the town eastward. At this point the city was renamed Archer, after James T. Archer, Florida's first Secretary of State. The first trains stopped in Archer in 1859.

Geography

Demographics

As of the census of 2000, there were 1,289 people, 487 households, and 319 families residing in the city. The racial makeup of the city was 60.74% White, 37.63% African American, 0.23% Native American, 0.16% Asian, and 1.24% from two or more races. Hispanic or Latino of any race were 2.25% of the population.

There were 487 households, out of which 35.1% had children under the age of 18 living with them, 40.0% were married couples living together, 20.9% had a female householder with no husband present, and 34.3% were non-families. 30.2% of all households were made up of individuals, and 11.7% had someone living alone who was 65 years of age or older. The average household size was 2.65 and the average family size was 3.32.

In the city, the population was spread out, with 31.3% under the age of 18, 8.5% from 18 to 24, 25.8% from 25 to 44, 22.8% from 45 to 64, and 11.6% who were 65 years of age or older. The median age was 34 years. For every 100 females, there were 82.8 males. For every 100 females age 18 and over, there were 77.2 males.

The median income for a household in the city was $27,875, and the median income for a family was $35,278. Males had a median income of $26,591 versus $21,613 for females. The per capita income for the city was $12,345. About 19.3% of families and 21.6% of the population were below the poverty line, including 30.0% of those under age 18 and 20.0% of those age 65 or over.

Education
Archer is served by the School Board of Alachua County, which operates an elementary school in the city. Students in sixth through eighth grade attend middle school in nearby Newberry. Students in ninth through twelfth grade attend Newberry High School in Newberry. The Alachua County Library District operates a branch library in the city.

Notable people
 Bo Diddley, rock & roll legend
 Thomas Gilbert Pearson, a founder of the National Association of Audubon Societies, which became the National Audubon Society

References

External links

 City of Archer official website

Cities in Alachua County, Florida
Gainesville metropolitan area, Florida
Cities in Florida
1850 establishments in Florida
Populated places established in 1850